Maurice Davies was the member of Parliament for the constituency of Caernarfon for the parliament of 1559.

References 

English MPs 1559
Members of Parliament for Caernarfon
Members of the Parliament of England (pre-1707) for constituencies in Wales
Year of birth unknown
Year of death unknown